Idol Poland (season 5) is the fifth season of Idol Poland.

Finalists

(ages stated at time of contest)

Finals elimination chart

Live Show Details

Pre Live Show (5 April 2017)

Live Show 1 (12 April 2017)
Theme: My Idol

Live Show 2 (19 April 2017)
Theme: Kings & Queens of Music

Live Show 3 (26 April 2017)
Theme: Dance

Live Show 4 (3 May 2017)
Theme: Love Songs

Live Show 5: Semi-final  (10 May 2017)
Theme: Movies/Judge's Choice

Live final (17 May 2017)

External links
 Official website

5
2017 Polish television seasons
2017 establishments in Poland